The Russian Academy of Rocket and Artillery Sciences (RARAN) is a non-profit scientific organization of the Russian Federation. RARAN coordinates the activities of scientists  who carry out complex research and development (R & D) on the creation, operation and use of modern weapons, military technology and special equipment. The Academy was established on April 5, 1994 by a decree of the RF President "in order to revive the traditions of Russian military science, and to develop scientific research in the country's defense complex". RARAN is the only scientific and expert organization in the power structures that has state status. It unites leading scientists and specialists from organizations of the Russian Ministry of Defense, other federal executive authorities and the defense industry. This union enables the solutions of problematic issues such as the systemic development of weapons and special military technology (VVST). According to its legal form, RARAN is a federal state budgetary institution. By the Decree of the RF Government on July 17, 1995 No. 715, RARAN was equated with branch academies. The principles of activity and its numbers were determined: 100 full members and 200 corresponding members. In addition, the charter provides for the possibility of electing honorary and foreign members. Since 2016, according to the decision of the board of the RF Military-Industrial Commission, RARAN was designated the head scientific organization for the Council of Chief Designers of the weapons systems of the Army. The President of the Academy was also appointed the head of this council.

Objectives 

 to conduct scientific research in the areas of precision rockets, artillery and anti-aircraft weapons, electronic equipment and systems for the control of arms and troops.
 to develop theory and technology for the creation of missile and artillery systems, including those used for peaceful purposes.
 to participate in the formation and development of programs in fundamental scientific research for the creation of advanced systems and weapons complexes.
 to train qualified specialists for the Russian Armed Forces and defense industry.

Academy Structure

Office of the Presidium 
 Secretariat of the Presidium
 Administrative management
 Financial and economic services
 Legal services
 Secretariat of the Council of Chief Designers

Scientific Departments of the Academy 
 Military-technical policy and military economy.
 Weapons systems for land missions.
 Weapons systems for combat in airspace.
 Weapons systems for dealing with space warfare.
 Weapons systems for ocean and naval theater control.
 Inter-specific intelligence systems.
 Advanced technological warfare based on new physical principles.
 Substances and materials for advanced weapons of warfare.
 Technical and technological development in the defense industry.
 Problems of military security.
 Material, technical and financial support of the Armed Forces of the Russian Federation.

Regional Scientific Centers 
 North-West Regional Scientific Center RARAN - St. Petersburg
 Volga Regional Scientific Center RARAN - Sarov
 Tula Regional Scientific Center RARAN - Tula
 Ural-Siberian Regional Scientific Center RARAN - Nizhny Tagil

Associate Members 
 Scientific Center "Aviation Technology and Armament" 
 Preobrazhensky Scientific Center
 Petrovsky Scientific Center 
 Scientific Center of Rocket and Space Systems 
 Scientific Center for Interspecific Research in Advanced Weapons, Military and Special Technology 
 Saint Petersburg Scientific Center 
 Scientific Center "Levsha"   
 Scientific Center "Innovation in Troops Logistics"   
 Scientific Center of Advanced Technologies for Military Equipment

Publications 
 "RARAN News"
 "Protection and Security"
 "Armament and Economics"
 "Weapons and Military Technology Research and Development Reference Library" : (10 volumes) 2004 - 2012
 "Scientific Library" (issued since 2014 in order to preserve the scientific heritage of Russian military science)

Scientific Conferences and Symposia 
"Modern methods of designing and testing missile and artillery weapons" (conducted since 1998)
 "Actual problems of design, manufacturing and testing of body armor"
 "Design of weapons systems and measuring complexes"

External links 
  "Military Thought" No. 3 March 2011, dedicated to RARAN
 Military encyclopedic dictionary
 Handbook of the Russian Council on International Affairs
 60th anniversary of the birth of the President of the Academy and the editor-in-chief of the journal, Doctor of Technical Sciences, Professor, Major General Vasily Mikhailovich Burenka
 XX years of the Russian Academy of Missile and Artillery Sciences // "Arsenal of the Fatherland" - information and analytical journal; No. 2 (10). 2014
 Information agency "Arms of Russia": "RARAN celebrates the 20th anniversary of its re-establishment" (published 04.21.14)

References

Organizations established in 1994
Ministry of Defence (Russia)
Military industry
Russian National Academies